The cantons of Gap are administrative divisions of the Hautes-Alpes department, in southeastern France. Since the French canton reorganisation which came into effect in March 2015, the town of Gap is subdivided into 4 cantons. Their seat is in Gap.

Population

References

Cantons of Hautes-Alpes